Hounslow is a large suburban district of West London,  west-southwest of Charing Cross. It is the administrative centre of the London Borough of Hounslow, and is identified in the London Plan as one of the 12 metropolitan centres in Greater London.

It is bounded by Isleworth to the east, Twickenham to its south, Feltham to its west and Southall to its north.

Hounslow includes the districts of Hounslow West, Heston, Cranford and Heathrow. Although most of the district lay within the London Borough of Hounslow,  some parts fall within the London Borough of Richmond upon Thames and the London Borough of Hillingdon including Heathrow Airport.

Most of Hounslow, including its Town Centre, the area south of the railway station and the localities of Lampton and Spring Grove, falls under the TW3 postcode. The TW4 postcode is made up of Hounslow West and parts of Cranford, whilst the TW5 postcode includes Heston and Cranford. Heathrow Airport and parts of Hatton comprise the TW6 postcode.

History

Etymology 
In old records, Hounslow is spelt 'Hundeslow' which points to the Anglo-Saxon phrase Hundes hlāw', translating to 'the Hound's barrow' or more accurately 'the barrow of a man named or nicknamed Hound'.

 Hounslow Town 
Hounslow was centred around the Holy Trinity Priory founded in 1211. The priory developed what had been a small village into a town with regular markets and other facilities for travellers heading to and from London. Although the priory was dissolved in 1539, the town remained an important staging post on the Bath Road.

The construction of the Great Western Railway line from London to Bristol from 1838 reduced long-distance travel along the Bath Road. By 1842, the local paper was reporting that the 'formerly flourishing village' (which used to stable 2000 horses) was suffering a 'general depreciation of property'. The Hounslow Loop Line was constructed in 1850 - which prompted new development. Hounslow Hospital opened in 1876 and closed in 1978. Hanworth Road drill hall (now the Treaty Lodge Hotel) was built for the 2nd Volunteer Battalion, The Middlesex Regiment.

The construction of the Great West Road (a by-pass for the Bath Road, around Brentford, Isleworth and Hounslow town centres) in the 1920s attracted the building of factories and headquarters of large companies and led to a great deal of housing development. After a decline in the 1970s, offices largely replaced factories and further expansion in hotel and housing stock started to take place.

 Hounslow Heath 
Hounslow Heath has a continuous recorded history dating back to the Norman period, in which it lent its name to the hamlet of Heathrow. It was infamously known for the numbers of highwaymen and footpads in the area, who targeted wealthy individuals and noblemen.

The Heath once had strategic importance as its routes acted as a throughway from London to the west and southwest of Britain. The present northern boundary of the Heath - Staines Road - was the Roman Road later known as the Devils Highway. There are several historic references to Roman camps surrounding the Heath. Both Oliver Cromwell and James II used the heath as a military encampment.

In 1784 the first accurate measurements were made on the heath to establish the base line for the Ordnance Survey trigonometrical survey of Great Britain. The event was attended by King George IV and Joseph Banks, president of the Royal Society.

In 1793, the Cavalry Barracks were constructed and were extended with the Beavers Lane Camp. Between 1914 and 1920 the heath became Hounslow Heath Aerodrome.

 Emergency services 
The territorial police force is the Metropolitan Police. Hounslow Police Station is located on Montague Road, adjacent to the High Street.

The statutory fire and rescue service in Hounslow is the London Fire Brigade (LFB), with the nearest fire station in Isleworth on London Road.

The nearest accident and emergency hospital is West Middlesex University Hospital, in Isleworth, which is part of the Chelsea and Westminster Hospital NHS Foundation Trust and a teaching hospital of the Imperial College School of Medicine. London Ambulance Service provides emergency ambulance services.

 Governance 
Historically in Middlesex, Hounslow was within the county's hundred of Isleworth in ancient times. Since 1965 Hounslow has been part of the London Borough of Hounslow, with parts in the London Boroughs of Hillingdon and Richmond upon Thames. Prior to this, Hounslow was part of the Municipal Borough of Heston and Isleworth, from 1835 until 1965. The south of Hounslow was part of the Municipal Borough of Twickenham, while Cranford was part of the Hayes and Harlington Urban District and Feltham Urban District.

 Geography 
Hounslow is separated from Twickenham by Hanworth Road (A314) Nelson Road, Hounslow Road (B361) and Whitton Dene/ Murray Park.

Hall Road, Bridge Road, the Hounslow Loop Line, Thornbury Park, Worton Way, the Piccadilly Line, Stucley Road and Osterley Park separate Hounslow and Isleworth.

The Norwood Green estate and Industrial area in North Hyde, separate Hounslow and Southall whilst the River Crane and Cranford Park form a natural boundary between Hounslow and Hayes

Historically, Hounslow's traditional western boundary followed the River Crane however it now extends to the Bath Road (A4), Duke of Northumberlands River and Great South-West Road (A30) and back to the river (to include Heathrow Airport).

 Demography 
The suburban district of Hounslow, including its localities Cranford, Heston, Hounslow West and Lampton, was 103,337 in the 2011 census, whereas the wider borough had a population of 254,000.

Hounslow has a high proportion of people who identify themselves as BAME (Black, Asian and minority Ethnic), and it is the borough's most diverse town. In seven of Hounslow's eight electoral wards, the BAME proportion is above 70%. The town has a large British Asian community.

 Economy 
Hounslow is an economic hub within the west of the capital city, with it having a large shopping centre which adjoins its high street and many restaurants, cafés and small businesses, many of which are associated with product assembly, marketing, telecommunications and Heathrow Airport, which has many businesses and public sector jobs in and around it to which the local population commute.  The settlement is also partially employed in the Commuter Belt with access between 45 and 60 minutes from most of Central London.

DHL Air UK has its head office in the Orbital Park in Hounslow.

Hounslow Town Centre is a busy predominantly retail centre, with a small number of commercial offices and civic buildings. There is a large shopping centre called the Treaty Centre which opened in 1987, containing JD, Next, H&M and many large branches of chain stores found in British high streets. It includes a food court along with over 50 shops. There is a large ASDA superstore located within the Blenheim Centre complex (which was completed in 2006) along with B&M, a Barnado's charity shop, a local health centre, a gym run by The Gym Group and Jungle V.I.P (a children's indoor play area).

A new retail area, the High Street Quarter, will be located near Hounslow High Street and is set to contain a 27-storey residential tower along with many shops, restaurants, and a ten-screen Cineworld cinema multiplex.

 Culture and community 
Hounslow Heath is a large public open space and local nature reserve to the west of Hounslow, a London borough.

Bell Square is an outdoor performance space next to the Bell pub. Hounslow Community Land Project was a community garden and sports area on a derelict piece of land on Hanworth Road.

 Twinning 
Hounslow is twinned with the following settlements around the world:

  Issy-les-Moulineaux, France
  Lahore, Pakistan
  Ramallah, Palestine
  Jalandhar, India

The London Borough of Hounslow also has a sister district agreement with Leningradsky District in Krasnodar Krai, Russia.

 Landmarks 
One of the earliest surviving houses in the town is The Lawn, in front of the Civic Centre with its public tennis courts, in brown brick with three double-hung sash windows set back in reveals with flat arches, roof with parapet and porch of fluted doric columns, pilasters, entablature and semi-circular traceried fanlight. The similar example of 44–50 Bath Road: also in brown brick and as is sometimes seen, has been painted. Nearby country houses include Osterley House, Syon House, Hanworth Park House and Worton Hall.

 Transport 

 Major roads 
There are three major roads in Hounslow. The east–west roads, the A4 'Great West Road' and the 'Bath Road' that connects Hounslow to Central London and Slough, and the A30 'Great South West Road' that connects it to Staines-upon-Thames, which meet at Henlys Roundabout in Hounslow West. There is also the north–south road, the A312 'The Causeway' and 'The Parkway', which connects Hounslow to Hampton in the south and Harrow to the north.

Additionally, A and B roads in Hounslow include the A314 'Hanworth Road' that starts in Hounslow and finishes in Hanworth, Feltham. The historic A315 'London Road', 'Hounslow High Street', 'Hanworth Road', 'Grove Road' and 'Staines Road';  which starts in Central London and ends in Bedfont, Feltham. In doing this, it connects Hounslow to towns and districts such as Kensington, Hammersmith, Chiswick, Brentford and Isleworth.

East-west roads
The A4 Great West Road joins with the A3006 Bath Road (from the A315) before Henlys Roundabout, which is in Hounslow West, from which a WNW route passes Heathrow Airport, terminals 1 to 3 and terminal 5 as the Bath Road and a WSW route, the A30, passes terminal 4, bypasses Staines and reaches the M25; the remainder is a mostly-minor route to Land's End, Cornwall.

The M4 motorway is two miles north; its nearest junction, J3, being northwest along the A312.

The A315 is the historic WSW road out of London, on which Hounslow's High Street is placed. To the east, it bisects Isleworth, Brentford and Chiswick. To the west it bisects North Feltham and Bedfont before joining the A30.

North-south roads
The north–south A312, The Parkway'', to the west of Hounslow leads south to Hampton or north to Harrow passing Waggoners' Roundabout (WNW of Henlys Roundabout in Hounslow West), Hayes, Yeading and Northolt.

Three minor roads converge on Heston from the A315 in parts of Hounslow, the A3063, A3005 and B363. The single road re-divides just north in Norwood Green into a northwest road to Southall (the A3005) and into the A4127 that passes by Hanwell, briefly using the A4020 west before bypassing Dormers Wells, passing Greenford to reach Sudbury, the town immediately to the west of Wembley and North Wembley.

For longer journeys north, the M4, A4 or A30 then M25 provides the best routes. For longer journeys south, Hanworth Road leads to the A316 that becomes the M3 motorway.

Trains and Underground

There are three main London Underground stations in the town; Hounslow East, Hounslow Central and Hounslow West, with all the stations being on the Piccadilly line. The District line used to operate services to Hounslow, and the town also has abandoned stations on the old line, such as Hounslow Town.

Hounslow railway station, operated by South Western Railway, is on the line to London Waterloo, or westwards to Reading, Weybridge, Woking or Windsor.  The line also offers services on the Hounslow Loop Line, opened 1850, further around the loop to Twickenham and Richmond. It is situated a fair distance from the town centre and is used far less than the Underground stations.

Bus services

Hounslow bus garage and an adjoining bus station are close to the High Street. In 1962, as a result of the final stage of the London trolleybus programme of conversion to motor bus operation, when Isleworth garage was closed, the staff from that depot (coded IH) were transferred to Hounslow. The property is owned by the RATP Group, which took it over with the purchase of London United from Transdev. In addition to its frequent and regular daytime services throughout the surrounding areas, Hounslow is served by the N9 night service from Heathrow Airport to Central London.

Hounslow Heath Aerodrome was a grass airfield and was operational from 1910 to 1920. It was in the London borough of Hounslow, and in 1919 was where the first scheduled daily international commercial air services began.

 Education 

St Mark's Catholic School is on Bath Road. Lampton School was previously Spring Grove Grammar School, in the area of Lampton. Kingsley Academy was formerly known as Hounslow Manor School and Hounslow Heath Junior School in Selwyn Close.

 Religious sites 

Due to the town's large South Asian community, Hounslow has a large array of religious sites to cater to the large Muslim, Hindu and Sikh communities as well as the Christian community.Mosques situated in the area include Hounslow Central Mosque, Hounslow Muslim Center, Mosque of Jummah Prayer, Islamic Integration Community Centre, Al-Furqan Education Trust and Madina Islamic Mission.Mandirs include the Lakshmi Narayan Temple and Jalaram Jupadi.Gurdwaras include Gurdwara Sri Guru Singh Sabha and Gurdwara Guru Nanak Nishkam Sewak Jatha.Churches''' include Our Lady Queen of Apostles, Holy Trinity Church, Hounslow Methodist Church, Hounslow Spiritualist Centre, Hounslow Pentecostal Church, Maxwell Park Church, Hounslow URC Church, St Paul's Church, St Stephen's Church, Hounslow United Reformed Church, St Michael & St Martin Church, Christian Community Church, Hounslow Pentecostal Church, Hounslow West Evangelical Church, Emmanuel Baptist Church, Hounslow Spiritualist Church, St John's Mar Thoma Church, Christ Embassy and Heston Methodist Church.

Sport 

A printed programme dated 7 July 1935 suggests that there may have been a motorcycle speedway race at a venue in Dockwell Lane, Feltham, branded as the Hounslow Speedway. Information suggests that more than one meeting was staged in conjunction with the Hounslow Motorcycle and Car Club.

In the late 20th century, Hounslow Hockey Club was successful at a national level but has since merged with Barnes Hockey Club. Hounslow Heath Golf Centre, situated on the western side of the Heath closed in 2016.

The Irish Guards GAA club is based in Hounslow.

Notable people

See also

References

Further reading

External links 

Hounslow Online – www.hounslowtw3.net Hounslow's local community website
Community Guide to Hounslow – www.activhounslow.com Hounslow's online guide
History of Hounslow town

Areas of London
Districts of the London Borough of Hounslow
Metropolitan centres of London
Pakistani-British culture in London
Places formerly in Middlesex